The Annunciation (from Latin ), also referred to as the Annunciation to the Blessed Virgin Mary, the Annunciation of Our Lady, or the Annunciation of the Lord, is the announcement by the archangel Gabriel to Mary that she would conceive and bear a son through a virgin birth and become the mother of Jesus Christ, the Christian Messiah and Son of God, marking the Incarnation. Gabriel told Mary to name her son Immanuel, meaning "God is with us".

Two separate churches, both in Nazareth but around half a mile apart, are venerated as the location of the event – the Catholic Basilica of the Annunciation and the Greek Orthodox Church of the Annunciation.

Many Christians observe this event with the Feast of the Annunciation on 25 March, an approximation of the northern vernal equinox nine full months before Christmas, the ceremonial birthday of Jesus.
The Annunciation is a key topic in Christian art in general, as well as in Marian art in the Catholic Church, having been especially prominent during the Middle Ages and Renaissance. A work of art depicting the Annunciation is sometimes itself called an Annunciation.

Religious sources

Book of Luke
In the Bible, the Annunciation is narrated in Luke 1:26–38:
26 And in the sixth month, the angel Gabriel was sent from God into a city of Galilee, called Nazareth,27 To a virgin espoused to a man whose name was Joseph, of the house of David; and the virgin's name was Mary.28 And the angel being come in, said unto her: Hail, full of grace, the Lord is with thee: blessed art thou among women.

29 Who having heard, was troubled at his saying, and thought with herself what manner of salutation this should be.30 And the angel said to her: Fear not, Mary, for thou hast found grace with God.31 Behold thou shalt conceive in thy womb, and shalt bring forth a son; and thou shalt call his name Jesus.32 He shall be great, and shall be called the Son of the most High; and the Lord God shall give unto him the throne of David his father; and he shall reign in the house of Jacob for ever.33 And of his kingdom there shall be no end.

34 And Mary said to the angel: How shall this be done, because I know not man?

35 And the angel answering, said to her: The Holy Ghost shall come upon thee, and the power of the most High shall overshadow thee. And therefore also the Holy which shall be born of thee shall be called the Son of God.36 And behold thy cousin Elizabeth, she also hath conceived a son in her old age; and this is the sixth month with her that is called barren:37 Because no word shall be impossible with God.

38 And Mary said: Behold the handmaid of the Lord; be it done to me according to thy word. And the angel departed from her.()

The archangel Gabriel's greeting to Mary forms the first part of the prayer, Hail Mary; Mary's response to the archangel forms the second versicle and response of the Angelus prayer. (Various Bible translations also give Gabriel's salutation as a variation on: "Greetings, you who are highly favored!")

Book of Matthew
A separate, briefer and different annunciation is that given to Joseph in Matthew 1:18
18 Now the generation of Christ was in this wise. When as his mother Mary was espoused to Joseph, before they came together, she was found with child, of the Holy Ghost. 19 Whereupon Joseph her husband, being a just man, and not willing publicly to expose her, was minded to put her away privately.

20 But while he thought on these things, behold the angel of the Lord appeared to him in his sleep, saying: Joseph, son of David, fear not to take unto thee Mary thy wife, for that which is conceived in her, is of the Holy Ghost.21 And she shall bring forth a son: and thou shalt call his name JESUS. For he shall save his people from their sins.

22 Now all this was done that it might be fulfilled which the Lord spoke by the prophet, saying: 23 Behold a virgin shall be with child, and bring forth a son, and they shall call his name Emmanuel, which being interpreted is, God with us.()

Manuscript 4Q246

Manuscript 4Q246 of the Dead Sea Scrolls reads:
[X] shall be great upon the earth. O king, all people shall make peace, and all shall serve him. He shall be called the son of the Great God, and by his name shall he be hailed as the Son of God, and they shall call him Son of the Most High.

It has been suggested that the similarity in content is such that Luke's version may in some way be dependent on the Qumran text.

In the Quran

The Annunciation is described in the Quran, in Surah  (Al-Imran – The Family of Imran) verses 45–51 (Yusuf Ali translation):
45 Behold! the angels said: "O Mary! God giveth thee glad tidings of a Word from Him: his name will be Christ Jesus, the son of Mary, held in honour in this world and the Hereafter and of (the company of) those nearest to God;"

Surah  (Maryam – Mary) verses 16–26 also refers to the Annunciation.

Location
Both the Roman Catholic and Eastern Orthodox Churches hold that the Annunciation took place at Nazareth, but slightly differ as to the precise location. Catholic tradition holds that the Annunciation occurred in Mary's home, while Eastern Orthodox tradition holds that it occurred at the town well, known as Mary's Well. The Basilica of the Annunciation marks the site preferred by the former, while the Greek Orthodox Church of the Annunciation marks that preferred by the latter.

Feast day

Catholicism

The feast of the Annunciation is usually held on 25 March. It is moved in the Catholic Church, Anglican and Lutheran liturgical calendars when that date falls during Holy Week or Easter Week or on a Sunday. The Eastern Orthodox Church, Oriental Orthodoxy, and Eastern Catholic Churches do not move the feast. Instead they have special combined liturgies for those years when the Annunciation coincides with another feast. In these churches, even on Good Friday a Divine Liturgy is celebrated when it coincides with the Annunciation.

When the calendar system of Anno Domini was first introduced by Dionysius Exiguus in AD 525, he assigned the beginning of the new year to 25 March since, according to Catholic theology, the era of grace began with the Incarnation of Christ. The first certain mentions of the feast are in a canon of the 656 Council of Toledo, where it is described as celebrated throughout the church. The 692 Council of Constantinople "in Trullo" forbade observance of any festivals during Lent, excepting Sunday and the Feast of the Annunciation. An earlier origin had been claimed for it on the grounds that it appeared in manuscripts of the sermons of Athanasius and Gregory Thaumaturgus but they were subsequently discovered to be spurious.

Along with Easter, 25 March was used as the New Year's Day in many pre-modern Christian countries. The holiday was moved to January 1 in France by Charles IX's 1564 Edict of Roussillon. In England, the feast of the Annunciation came to be known as Lady Day, and Lady Day marked the beginning of the English new year until 1752. Also in England, the 1240 Synod of Worcester banned all servile work during the Feast of the Annunciation, making it a day of rest.

Eastern Christianity

In the Eastern Orthodox, Eastern Catholic, and Oriental Orthodox Churches, the Feast of the Annunciation is one of the twelve "Great Feasts" of the liturgical year, and is among the eight of them that are counted as "feasts of the Lord". Throughout the Orthodox Church, the feast is celebrated on 25 March. In the churches that use the new style Calendar (Revised Julian or Gregorian), this date coincides with 25 March on the civil calendar, while in those churches using the old style Julian calendar, 25 March is reckoned to fall on 7 April on the civil calendar, and will fall on 8 April starting in the year 2100. Greek Independence Day is celebrated on the feast of the Annunciation and 25 March is also a national holiday in the Lebanon.

The traditional hymn (troparion) for the feast of the Annunciation goes back to St Athanasius. It runs:

Today is the beginning of our salvation,
And the revelation of the eternal mystery!
The Son of God becomes the Son of the Virgin
As Gabriel announces the coming of Grace.
Together with him let us cry to the Theotokos:
"Rejoice, O Full of Grace, the Lord is with you!"

As the action initiating the Incarnation of Christ, the Annunciation has such an important place in Orthodox Christian theology that the festal Divine Liturgy of St. John Chrysostom is always celebrated on the feast, even if it falls on Great and Holy Friday, the day when the crucifixion of Jesus is remembered. Indeed, the Divine Liturgy is celebrated on Great and Holy Friday only when the latter coincides with the feast of the Annunciation. If the Annunciation falls on Pascha (Easter Sunday) itself, a coincidence which is called Kyriopascha, then it is celebrated jointly with the Resurrection, which is the focus of Easter. Due to these and similar rules, the rubrics surrounding the celebration of the feast are the most complex of all in Orthodox Christian liturgics.

St Ephraim taught that the date of the conception of Jesus Christ fell on 10 Nisan on the Hebrew calendar, the day in which the passover lamb was selected according to Exodus 12 (Hymn 4 on the Nativity). Some years 10 Nisan falls on 25 March, which is the traditional date for the Feast of the Annunciation and is an official holiday in Lebanon.

In art

The Annunciation has been one of the most frequent subjects of Christian art. Depictions of the Annunciation go back to early Christianity, with the Priscilla catacomb including the oldest known fresco of the Annunciation, dating to the 4th century. It has been a favorite artistic subject in both the Christian East and as Roman Catholic Marian art, particularly during the Middle Ages and Renaissance, and figures in the repertoire of almost all of the great masters. The figures of the virgin Mary and the angel Gabriel, being emblematic of purity and grace, were favorite subjects of Roman Catholic Marian art, where the scene is also used to represent the perpetual virginity of Mary via the announcement by the angel Gabriel that Mary would conceive a child to be born the Son of God.

Works on the subject have been created by artists such as Sandro Botticelli, Leonardo da Vinci, Caravaggio, Duccio, Henry Ossawa Tanner, Jan van Eyck, and Murillo among others. The mosaics of Pietro Cavallini in Santa Maria in Trastevere in Rome (1291), the frescos of Giotto in the Scrovegni Chapel in Padua (1303), Domenico Ghirlandaio's fresco at the church of Santa Maria Novella in Florence (1486), and Donatello's gilded sculpture at the church of Santa Croce, Florence (1435) are famous examples.

Music 
Hans Leo Hassler composed a motet Dixit Maria, setting Mary's consent. Johann Sebastian Bach and others composed cantatas for the feast of the annunciation which is still celebrated in the Lutheran Church, such as Wie schön leuchtet der Morgenstern, BWV 1.

See also  
 Angelus
 Annunciade, religious order
 Annunciation of Ustyug
 Basilica of the Annunciation
 Chronology of Jesus
 Expectation of the Blessed Virgin Mary
 Greek Orthodox Church of the Annunciation, Nazareth
 Incarnation (Christianity)
 Order of the Most Holy Annunciation
 Roman Catholic Marian art
 Perpetual Virginity of Mary

Notes

Citations

References

Further reading

External links

 The Annunciation Icons
  The Annunciation at art-threads

1st-century BC Christianity
Angelic apparitions in the Bible
 
Christian terminology
Gabriel
Gospel of Luke
Joyful Mysteries
Mary, mother of Jesus
Nativity of Jesus in worship and liturgy
New Testament miracles
Vulgate Latin words and phrases